Morgan Township is one of sixteen townships in Franklin County, Iowa, United States.  As of the 2010 census, its population was 265 and it contained 148 housing units.

History
Morgan Township was named for Lewis H. Morgan, a pioneer settler and native of Kentucky.

Geography

Cities, towns, villages
 Coulter (west edge)
 Dows (east quarter)

Cemeteries
The township contains Morgan Cemetery, Morgan Township Cemetery, Mount Hope Cemetery and Saint Peter's Lutheran Cemetery.

Transportation
 Interstate 35

School districts
 Cal Community School District
 Dows Community School District

Political districts
 Iowa's 4th congressional district
 State House District 54
 State Senate District 27

References

External links
 City-Data.com

Townships in Iowa
Townships in Franklin County, Iowa